María del Pilar "Maripily" Rivera Borrero (born 15 June 1977) is a Puerto Rican actress, model, and television presenter.

Early years
María del Pilar Rivera Borrero was born on 15 June 1977 in Ponce, Puerto Rico. Her parents were Hector Rivera and Pilar Borrero. She earned a B.S. degree in journalism from the Interamerican University of Puerto Rico and for a short time worked as a reporter for Univision.

Career
Rivera Borrero has been a model since 1995 when she took part in the Miss Puerto Rico Petite pageant. She was also a finalist in the 1999 Miss Puerto Rico Petite Pageant. She also starred in the reality show "Famosas VIP" in the Telefutura network. Rivera co-hosted "Eso vale" and "No te duermas" with Héctor Marcano in Puerto Rico's WAPA-TV. She also worked in JAM for Telemundo internacional. Rivera played a casino waitress in the 2009 Puerto Rican film Miente. She was expected to perform in a cameo role in a 2012 Orlando, Florida, charitable fundraising performance of the play Los Monologos de la Vagina (The Vagina Monologues), but backed out two days beforehand due to a contractual dispute and prior year's problem with expense compensation.

Rivera Borrero opened and operated a Guaynabo, Puerto Rico, fashion store for several years called Maripily Boutique, which burned down in 2007, and later reopened. Her current entrepreneurial endeavors include selling her own lines of jeans, swimwear, underwear, shoes, and handbags through the Puerto Rican chain Pompis Store (pompis is Spanish slang for buttocks). Her clothing design places special importance on flattering a range of body types, including plumper figures. In 2013, she launched her own fragrance, MP by Maripily.

Personal life
Rivera Borrero had a son from a relationship with José Antonio García. The son was also named José Antonio García.

Rivera Borrero married  baseball star Roberto Alomar on 1 June 2009. Rivera accused Alomar of domestic violence and a temporary injunction was granted but the charges against Alomar were later dismissed by the Court. Rivera has been called a "sex symbol", a "drama queen" and the "Paris Hilton of Puerto Rico".

In December 2013, Rivera Borrero became engaged to businessman Alberto Rodríguez and they planned a May 2014 wedding. The ceremony was to take place at the historic Ponce Cathedral in Ponce, Puerto Rico, with a reception at the equally historic Castillo Serralles castle, with Shanira Blanco scheduled to be her maid of honor. Rodriguez is Chief Operating Officer at Spanish Broadcasting System. The wedding was subsequently cancelled. The couple subsequently got together again and continued to see each other for a while. Then later that year, Maripily Rivera made accusations of domestic violence against Rodriguez resulting in his arrest on 29 October 2014. The matter was brought before judge Deborah White-Labora of the Dade County Courthouse, but was dismissed as the prosecution did not have the necessary evidence. Rodriguez was encouraged to bring charges of defamation and slander against Maripily, but responded that he did not want to pursue the matter, wanted to return to his projects at SBS, and said he "wished [Maripily] the best in her life and her career" as he left the courthouse. That ended the couple's relationship.

See also

 List of Puerto Ricans

References

External links

1977 births
Living people
21st-century Puerto Rican actresses
Actresses from Ponce, Puerto Rico
Puerto Rican film actresses
Puerto Rican television actresses
Puerto Rican businesspeople
Puerto Rican television presenters